Richard Gus Seeborg (born November 4, 1956) is the chief United States district judge of the United States District Court for the Northern District of California. He formerly served as a United States magistrate judge in the same district.

Early life and education 

Born in Landstuhl, Germany, Seeborg earned a Bachelor of Arts in history summa cum laude from Yale University in May 1978 and then earned a Juris Doctor from Columbia Law School in 1981. From 1981 to 1982, Seeborg served as a law clerk to judge John H. Pratt of the U.S. District Court for the District of Columbia.

Professional career 

In 1982, Seeborg joined the law firm of Morrison & Foerster.  He became a partner with the firm in 1987. In 1991, Seeborg left Morrison & Foerster to become an Assistant United States Attorney for the Northern District of California in San Jose, California.  He served in that post until 1998, when he returned to Morrison & Foerster, working as a partner and focusing on a litigation practice in the fields of securities, intellectual property and general commercial matters.

Work as a magistrate judge 

On February 9, 2001, Seeborg became a United States magistrate judge for the United States District Court for the Northern District of California.

Federal judicial service 

On August 7, 2009, President Barack Obama nominated Seeborg to be a United States district judge on the United States District Court for the Northern District of California.  On October 15, 2009, the United States Senate Committee on the Judiciary voted to send Seeborg's nomination to the full Senate.  The Senate confirmed Seeborg by unanimous consent on December 24, 2009. He received his commission on January 4, 2010. He became Chief Judge on February 1, 2021 after Phyllis J. Hamilton assumed senior status.

Notable rulings 

On March 6, 2019 Seeborg ruled that Commerce Secretary Wilbur Ross could not add a question about citizenship to the 2020 United States Census.

On April 8, 2019 Seeborg ruled that non-Mexican asylum seekers did not have to stay in Mexico while awaiting their court proceedings.

Personal 

Seeborg resides in San Francisco, California.

References

External links

1956 births
Living people
20th-century American lawyers
21st-century American judges
21st-century American lawyers
Assistant United States Attorneys
California lawyers
Columbia Law School alumni
German emigrants to the United States
Judges of the United States District Court for the Northern District of California
People associated with Morrison & Foerster
People from Kaiserslautern (district)
United States district court judges appointed by Barack Obama
United States magistrate judges
Yale University alumni